Samningen (The Samnanger Resident) is a local Norwegian newspaper published in the municipality of Samnanger in Hordaland county. The paper was established in 1977 and is published weekly, on Thursdays. It is edited by Hallvard Tysse. The paper's office is located in Årland.

Circulation
According to the Norwegian Audit Bureau of Circulations and National Association of Local Newspapers, Samningen has had the following annual circulation:
2004: 1,339
2005: 1,360
2006: 1,374
2007: 1,380
2008: 1,387
2009: 1,375
2010: 1,393
2011: 1,418
2012: 1,404
2013: 1,419
2014: 1,438
2015: 1,433
2016: 1,424

References

External links
Samningen homepage

Newspapers published in Norway
Norwegian-language newspapers
Samnanger
Mass media in Hordaland
Newspapers established in 1977
1977 establishments in Norway